The 1914 United States Senate election in South Carolina was held on November 3, 1914 to select the U.S. Senator from the state of South Carolina. It was the first election in South Carolina in which the voters were able to choose the candidate in the general election. Incumbent Democratic Senator Ellison D. Smith won the Democratic primary and defeated nominal opposition in the general election to win another six-year term.

Democratic primary
Coleman Livingston Blease, Governor of South Carolina from 1910 to 1914, was barred from seeking another term by the South Carolina constitution. He wanted to continue holding a public office so he challenged incumbent Senator Ellison D. Smith in the Democratic primary election for U.S. Senator. However, the voters were tired of Blease and he and those allied with him suffered defeat in the 1914 Democratic primaries on August 25.

General election campaign
Since the end of Reconstruction in 1877, the Democratic Party dominated the politics of South Carolina and its statewide candidates were never seriously challenged. Smith did not campaign for the general election as there was no chance of defeat.

Results

|-
| 
| colspan=5 |Democratic hold
|-

See also
 List of United States senators from South Carolina
 United States Senate elections, 1914
 United States House of Representatives elections in South Carolina, 1914
 South Carolina gubernatorial election, 1914

References
 
 "Report of the Secretary of State to the General Assembly of South Carolina.  Part II." Reports and Resolutions of the General Assembly of the State of South Carolina. Volume IV. Columbia, SC: 1915, p. 339.

United States Senate
1914
South Carolina